The Bohemian Club is a private club with two locations: a city clubhouse in the Nob Hill district of San Francisco, California and the Bohemian Grove, a retreat north of the city in Sonoma County. Founded in 1872 from a regular meeting of journalists, artists, and musicians, it soon began to accept businessmen and entrepreneurs as permanent members, as well as offering temporary membership to university presidents (notably Berkeley and Stanford) and military commanders who were serving in the San Francisco Bay Area. Today, the club has a membership of many local and global leaders, ranging from artists and musicians to businessmen.  Membership is restricted to men only.

Clubhouse

The City Club is located in a six-story masonry building at the corner of Post Street and Taylor Street, two blocks west of Union Square, and on the same block as both the Olympic Club and the Marines Memorial Club. The clubhouse contains dining rooms, meeting rooms, a bar, a library, an art gallery, a theater, and guest rooms.

Bohemian Grove

Every year, the club hosts a two-week-long (three weekends) camp at Bohemian Grove, which is notable for its illustrious guest list and its eclectic Cremation of Care ceremony which mockingly burns an effigy of "Care" (the normal woes of life) with grand pageantry, pyrotechnics, and brilliant costumes, all done at the edge of a lake and at the base of a forty-foot "stone" owl statue (actually made of concrete). In addition to that ceremony, devised by co-founder James F. Bowman in 1881, there are also two outdoor performances (dramatic and comedic plays), often with elaborate set design and orchestral accompaniment. The more elaborate of the two is the Grove Play, or High Jinks; the more ribald is called Low Jinks. More often than not, the productions are original creations of the Associate members, but active participation of hundreds of members of all backgrounds is traditional.

Nathanial Brittan Party House 

Nathaniel J. Brittan co-founded the Bohemian Club of San Francisco in 1872, and by 1892 Brittan was the president of the club. He built the Nathanial Brittan Party House in San Carlos, California in order to entertain his friends from the club and to use as a hunting lodge.

History

Bohemianism

In New York City and other American metropolises in the late 1850s, groups of young, cultured journalists flourished as self-described "bohemians", until the American Civil War broke them up and sent them out as war correspondents. During the war, reporters began to assume the title "bohemian", and newspapermen in general took up the moniker. "Bohemian" became synonymous with "newspaper writer". California journalist Bret Harte first wrote as "The Bohemian" in The Golden Era in 1861, with this persona taking part in many satirical doings. Harte described San Francisco as a sort of Bohemia of the West. Mark Twain called himself and poet Charles Warren Stoddard bohemians in 1867.

Founding
The Bohemian Club was originally formed in April 1872 by and for journalists who wished to promote a fraternal connection among men who enjoyed the arts. Michael Henry de Young, proprietor of the San Francisco Chronicle, provided this description of its formation in a 1915 interview:

Journalists were to be regular members; artists and musicians were to be honorary members. The group quickly relaxed its rules for membership to permit some people to join who had little artistic talent, but enjoyed the arts and had greater financial resources. Eventually, the original "bohemian" members were in the minority and the wealthy and powerful controlled the club.<ref>Bohemian Club. Constitution, By-laws, and Rules, Officers, Committees, and Members, Bohemian Club, 1904, p. 11. [https://books.google.com/books?id=OKc_AAAAYAAJ&pg=PA11 Semi-centennial high jinks in the Grove, 1922], Bohemian Club, 1922, pp. 11–22.</ref> Club members who were established and successful, respectable family men, defined for themselves their own form of bohemianism which included men who were bon vivants, sometime outdoorsmen, and appreciators of the arts. Club member and poet George Sterling responded to this redefinition:

 Despite his purist views, Sterling associated very closely with the Bohemian Club, and caroused with artist and industrialist alike at the Bohemian Grove.

Oscar Wilde, upon visiting the club in 1882, is reported to have said "I never saw so many well-dressed, well-fed, business-looking Bohemians in my life."

Membership
A number of past membership lists are in public domain, but modern club membership lists are private. Some prominent figures have been given honorary membership, such as Richard Nixon and William Randolph Hearst. Members have included some U.S. presidents (usually before they are elected to office), many cabinet officials, and CEOs of large corporations, including major financial institutions. Major military contractors, oil companies, banks (including the Federal Reserve), utilities, and national media have high-ranking officials as club members or guests. Many members are, or have been, on the board of directors of several of these corporations; however, artists and lovers of art are among the most active members. The club's bylaws require ten percent of the membership be accomplished artists of all types (composers, musicians, singers, actors, lighting artists, painters, authors, etc.).  During the first half of the 20th century membership in the club was especially valued by painters and sculptors, who exhibited their work on the premises, in both permanent displays and special exhibitions, and did not pay any commissions on sales to members.  Many of the club's artists were nationally recognized figures, such as William Keith, Arthur Frank Mathews, Xavier Martinez, Jules Eugene Pages, Edwin Deakin, William Ritschel, Jo Mora, Maynard Dixon and Arthur Putnam.

The club motto is "Weaving Spiders Come Not Here", a line taken from Act 2, Scene 2, of Shakespeare's A Midsummer Night's Dream. The club motto implies that outside concerns and business deals are to be left outside. When gathered in groups, Bohemians usually adhere to the injunction, though discussion of business often occurs between pairs of members.

Bret Harte Memorial

A bronze relief by Jo Mora is installed on the exterior of the building. It serves as a memorial to author and poet Bret Harte. The relief, which is approximately 3 ft. 3 7/8 in. x 7 ft. 11 5/8 in. x 2 1/2 in. (101 cm x 243 cm x 6 cm), was first dedicated on August 15, 1919, as a tribute by Mora, who was a member, to fellow Bohemian Club member Harte. The relief shows fifteen characters from books by Harte. It is inscribed:

Proper left, upper corner:
J J MORA
AUGUST 15, 1919
Proper left, lower edge:
L. DE ROME
BRONZE FOUNDRY
Top center wreath:
IN
MEMORIAM
BRET
HARTE
1836–1902
AD
followed by the founder's mark for L. De Rome. When the original building was torn down, the relief was removed. In 1934, it was reinstalled on the building that stands today.

See also

 List of Bohemian Club members
 Belizean Grove – Women-only club in New York City modeled after the Bohemian Grove
 Bilderberg Group
 Trilateral Commission
 The Family (club)
 Rancheros visitadores
 List of American gentlemen's clubs
 Membership discrimination in California social clubs

References
Notes

Bibliography

 Domhoff, G. William. Bohemian Grove and Other Retreats: A Study in Ruling-Class Cohesiveness, Harper & Row, 1975. 
 Dulfer & Hoag. Our Society Blue Book, San Francisco, Dulfer & Hoag, 1925.
 Garnett, Porter, The Bohemian Jinks: A Treatise, 1908
 
 Parry, Albert. (2005.) Garretts & Pretenders: A History of Bohemianism in America, Cosimo, Inc. 
 Watson, E. H. "The Bohemian Club Legacy." The English review'' 62.3 (1936): 289-306.

Primary sources

 Bohemian Club. Constitution, By-laws, and Rules, Officers, Committees, and Members, 1904
 Bohemian Club. Semi-centennial high jinks in the Grove, July 28, 1922. Haig Patigian, Sire.
 Bohemian Club. History, officers and committees, incorporation, constitution, by-laws and rules, former officers, members, in memoriam, 1960
 Bohemian Club. History, officers and committees, incorporation, constitution, by-laws and rules, former officers, members, in memoriam, 1962

Archival Sources
Finding Aid to the Bohemian Club Collection 1872-2009 (bulk 1890-1970) at the San Francisco Public Library, Book Arts and Special Collections Center
Finding Aid to Bohemian Grove Photographs, 1890 to 1950, at San Francisco Public Library, San Francisco History Center

 
1872 establishments in California
Bohemianism
Clubs and societies in California
Culture in the San Francisco Bay Area
Gentlemen's clubs in the United States
Men's organizations in the United States
Nob Hill, San Francisco
Organizations based in San Francisco
Organizations based in Sonoma County, California
Organizations established in 1872